Sport compact is an American car classification for a high-performance version of an affordable compact car or a subcompact car. There is no precise definition and the description is applied for marketing purposes to a wide variety of models.

Cars began to be marketed as sport compacts in the mid-1980s, when it was used for option packages on American-built coupes. Since then, it has also been used for standalone sports car models and cars imported from Europe and Asia.

The European equivalent is a hot hatch, however sport compacts are not restricted to just hatchback body styles.



Characteristics
A sport compact should "fulfill the multiple duties of family car, plaything, and daily driver". Many sport compacts have coupe, sedan or hatchback body styles and are built on mass-production platforms. Other common (but not essential) characteristics include front-wheel drive or all-wheel drive, a four-cylinder gasoline engine, suspension tuned for handling and bodywork designed to improve aerodynamics or allow for larger wheels.

"Econosport" is a rarely used term for a sport version of a small economy car.

History 

An early sport compact was the 1968 Ford Capri, a European coupe built on the platform of the second generation Ford Cortina sedans.

The early American-built sport compact models consisted of performance or sporting packages for mass-produced compact car coupes in the 1980s, for example the 1986 Chevrolet Cavalier Z24, the 1986 Ford EXP Sport Coupe and the 1988 Plymouth Sundance. Such models only achieved moderate sales. Sport compact models gained greater prominence by the mid-1990s, being sold in significant numbers in models such as the 1993 Ford Probe (based on the Mazda MX-6 platform) and the 1995 Chevrolet Cavalier/Pontiac Sunfire badge-engineered twins.

Sports compacts of the 2000s include the 2001-2003 Ford ZX2, the 2004-2007 Saturn Ion Red Line, the 2005-2010 Chevrolet Cobalt SS and the 2003-2005 Dodge Neon SRT-4.

European hot hatches are considered 'sport compact' cars in the North American market. Examples include the 1976-present Volkswagen Golf GTI and the 2000-present Mini Cooper. Similarly, most Japanese hot hatches and sports coupes are classified as 'sport compact' cars when sold in North America, for example the 1984-present Honda Civic Si, 2007-2013 Mazdaspeed3, and the 2012-present Toyota 86.

Models

Motorsport

Sport compact cars are often used in motorsport events, due to their relative light weight. They have competed in various types of motorsport, including autocross, rallying, rallycross, touring car racing, drifting and drag racing.

From 2005–2012, International Sport Compact Auto Racing Series was an American stock car racing series for sports compacts which mostly raced on paved oval racetracks.

See also
 Car classification
 Car tuning
 Hot hatch
 Sports car

References

 
Car classifications